Harry Knight (born September 9, 1953) is a former American football quarterback who played four seasons with the Winnipeg Blue Bombers of the Canadian Football League. He was drafted by the Oakland Raiders in the ninth round of the 1975 NFL Draft. He played college football at the University of Richmond.

References

External links
Just Sports Stats
College stats

Living people
1953 births
Players of American football from Virginia
American football quarterbacks
Canadian football quarterbacks
American players of Canadian football
Richmond Spiders football players
Winnipeg Blue Bombers players
Sportspeople from Newport News, Virginia